Pseudohadena is a genus of moths of the family Noctuidae.

Species
 Pseudohadena albilacustris Ronkay, Varga & Gyulai, 2002
 Pseudohadena anatine Pekarsky, 2012
 Pseudohadena arenacea (Ronkay, Varga & Fábián, 1995)
 Pseudohadena argyllostigma Varga & Ronkay, 1991
 Pseudohadena armata (Alphéraky, 1887)
 Pseudohadena cymatodes (Boursin, 1954)
 Pseudohadena deserticola Ronkay, Varga & Fábián, 1995
 Pseudohadena elinguis (Püngeler, 1914)
 Pseudohadena evanida Püngeler, 1914
 Pseudohadena gorbunovi Pekarsky, 2012
 Pseudohadena igorkostyuki Ronkay, Varga & Fábián, 1995
 Pseudohadena jordana (Staudinger, 1900)
 Pseudohadena leucochlora Ronkay, Varga & Gyulai, 2002
 Pseudohadena magnitudinis Hacker & Ebert, 2002
 Pseudohadena obsoleta Ronkay, Varga & Fábián, 1995
 Pseudohadena phasmidia Ronkay, Varga & Fábián, 1995
 Pseudohadena pseudamoena Boursin, 1943
 Pseudohadena striolata (Filipjev, 1949)
 Pseudohadena tellieri (Lucas, 1907)
 Pseudohadena vulnerea (Grote, 1883)

References
 Pekarsky, O. (2012). "Two new species of Pseudohadena Alphéraky, 1889 from Kazakhstan (Lepidoptera, Noctuidae, Xyleninae)." ZooKeys 187: 9–34.
Natural History Museum Lepidoptera genus database
Pseudohadena at funet

Xyleninae